Triarius lividus is a species of skeletonizing leaf beetle or flea beetle in the family Chrysomelidae. It is found in Central America and North America.

References

Further reading

 
 
 
 
 
 
 
 

Galerucinae
Beetles described in 1884
Taxa named by John Lawrence LeConte